The 2016–17 EuroCup Women is the fifteenth edition of FIBA Europe's second-tier international competition for women's basketball clubs under such name.

Teams
Teams were confirmed by FIBA Europe on 22 June 2016.

 * Since Northern Cyprus is not a member of FIBA, Northern Cypriot Yakin Dogu University registered in Turkey's basketball league to compete in FIBA Eurocup.

Pots
Draw seedings for Conference 1 Qualifiers:

Draw seedings for Conference 1 Regular Season:

Draw seedings for Conference 2 Qualifiers:

Draw seedings for Conference 2 Regular Season:

Qualification round

Conference 1

|}

Conference 2

|}

Group stage

Conference 1

Group A

Group B

Group C

Group D

Conference 2

Group E

Group F

Group G

Group H

Round of 16

Qualified teams
The winners and runners-up of each of the eight groups in the group stage qualify for the final stages.

Seeding
The qualified teams are seeded in the round of 16 according to their results in the group stage.

Games
Seed in parentheses.

|}

Round of 8

|}

Final bracket

Qualified teams
The quarter-finals involves eight teams: the four teams which qualified as winners of the Rounf of 8, the two fifth-placed and the two sixth-placed teams from the Euroleague Regular Season.

Each tie is played, as the Round of 16 and Round of 8, over two legs, with each team playing one leg at home.

Bracket

See also
 2016–17 EuroLeague Women

References

External links
EuroCup Women website

EuroCup Women seasons
2016–17 in European women's basketball leagues